Elections to Daventry District Council were held on 2 May 2002. One third of the council was up for election and the Conservative Party stayed in overall control of the council. Overall turnout was 35%.

After the election, the composition of the council was:
Conservative 26
Labour 10
Liberal Democrat 1
Independent 1

Election result

Ward results

References
2002 Daventry election result
Tories increase control of Daventry
 Ward results

2002 English local elections
2002
2000s in Northamptonshire